Protein SOGA3 also known as suppressor of glucose, autophagy associated 3 (SOGA3) is a protein in humans that is encoded by the SOGA3 gene.

References